The 1960 Northwestern Wildcats team represented Northwestern University during the 1960 Big Ten Conference football season. In their sixth year under head coach Ara Parseghian, the Wildcats compiled a 5–4 record (3–4 against Big Ten Conference opponents) and finished in a four-way tie for fifth place in the Big Ten Conference.

The team's offensive leaders were Dick Thornton with 901 passing yards, Mike Stock with 536 rushing yards, and Elbert Kimbrough with 378 receiving yards.

Schedule

References

Northwestern
Northwestern Wildcats football seasons
Northwestern Wildcats football